Delta Trianguli, Latinized from Delta Tri, is a spectroscopic binary star system approximately  away in the constellation of Triangulum. The primary star is a yellow dwarf, while the secondary star is thought to be an orange dwarf. It has an apparent magnitude of +4.87 and forms an optical (line-of-sight) triple with Gamma Trianguli and 7 Trianguli.

Stellar components 
Delta Trianguli A is a main sequence star with a stellar classification of G0V and a mass similar to the Sun. The spectral characteristics of the smaller companion Delta Trianguli B are not well determined since the close orbit makes observations difficult, with estimates of the spectral class ranging from G9V to K4V. The Delta Trianguli stars orbit their center of mass with an estimated separation of 0.106 AU; it is certainly less than one AU. The orbital period is 10.02 days and the eccentricity of the orbit is only 0.020. The orbit is inclined about 167° to the line of sight from Earth.

A 2008 search for a tertiary companion to this system using an adaptive optics system on the VLT proved unsuccessful. Examination of the system in infrared light at 70 μm shows no excess emission that would otherwise indicate the presence of a disk of orbiting dust.

Naming

See also 

 V4046 Sagittarii

References

External links 
 

G-type main-sequence stars
K-type main-sequence stars
Trianguli, Delta
Spectroscopic binaries

Triangulum (constellation)
Trianguli, Delta
Durchmusterung objects
Trianguli, 08
0092
013974
010644
0660